Clive Merrison (born 15 September 1945) is a British actor of film, television, stage and radio. He trained at Rose Bruford College. He is best known for his long running BBC Radio portrayal of Sherlock Holmes, having played the part in all 64 episodes of the 1989–1998 series of Sherlock Holmes dramatisations, and all 16 episodes of The Further Adventures of Sherlock Holmes (2002–2010).

Television 
He has made numerous television appearances. He appeared as Boris Savinkov the White Russian commander in the series Reilly: Ace of Spies (1983) starring Sam Neill as Reilly. He has twice appeared in supporting roles in Doctor Who, in The Tomb of the Cybermen (1967) and Paradise Towers (1987). He has also appeared in Yes, Prime Minister, Kit Curran, The Labours of Erica, Bergerac, Mann's Best Friends, Double First, Drop the Dead Donkey, Time Riders, Pie in the Sky, The Tomorrow People, Mortimer's Law, The Bill, Believe Nothing, Midsomer Murders (twice), Foyle's War, Lewis and The Brief. He played Mark's father in the 2010 Peep Show Christmas special, and also played Clement Attlee in the 2012 TV movie Bert and Dickie. He has also done voice work as a guest appearance in the children's animated series Testament: The Bible in Animation and Shakespeare: The Animated Tales.

Stage 
He portrayed Antonin Artaud in the Rome and London premieres of Charles Marowitz's play, Artaud at Rodez.
He also portrayed the headmaster in the original National Theatre and Broadway productions of Alan Bennett's hit play, The History Boys which went on to win 6 Tony Awards and an Oliver for Best New Play.
Merrison was a member of Laurence Olivier's National Theatre Company in the 1970s and the Royal Shakespeare Company, at the Royal Shakespeare Theatre in Stratford-on-Avon.

Film 
Merrison played the onscreen father of Kate Winslet in the 1994 film Heavenly Creatures, directed by Peter Jackson, and the traditionalist headmaster in Alan Bennett's The History Boys, filmed in 2006. He was the forger in the 1981 film Escape to Victory and also played Bartholomew Sholto in The Sign of Four (1983), Desmond Fairchild in An Awfully Big Adventure (1995) and the lawyer in Saving Grace (2000). His other film credits included roles in Henry VIII and His Six Wives (1972), Riddles of the Sphinx (1977), Coming Out of the Ice (1982), the Clint Eastwood film Firefox (1982), The English Patient (1996), True Blue (1996), Photographing Fairies (1997), Janice Beard (1999) and Pandaemonium (2000).

Sherlock Holmes on radio 
From 5 November 1989 to 5 July 1998, he played the lead role of Sherlock Holmes on radio in a series of BBC Radio 4 dramatisations, with Michael Williams as Dr. Watson. Later, with Andrew Sachs as Watson, Merrison continued to play Holmes in the Bert Coules-scripted pastiche series The Further Adventures of Sherlock Holmes, the first series of which was broadcast in 2002, the second in 2004, the third in 2008-9 and the fourth in 2010. He is the first actor to have played Holmes in adaptations of every short story and novel by Arthur Conan Doyle about the character.

Other radio appearances 
Merrison has also appeared in other BBC radio series and plays, including Groosham Grange; Burn the Aeneid! by Martyn Wade; One Winter's Afternoon; Sunday at Sant' Agata (in which he played Giuseppe Verdi); the 2003 adaptation of John Wyndham's The Midwich Cuckoos, in which he played Prof. Gordon Zellaby; Mr. Standfast; the 2011 adaptation of A Tale of Two Cities (in which he played the Marquis St. Evremonde); the 2006 radio adaptation of The History Boys (in which he played "The Headmaster", a role he repeated on film); and Strangers and Brothers.

Selected filmography
 1972 Henry VIII and His Six Wives as Weston
 1977 Riddles of the Sphinx as Chris
 1981 Escape to Victory as The Forger – The English
 1981 Mark Gertler: Fragments of a Biography as Futurist
 1982 Coming Out of the Ice as Bikov
 1982 Firefox as Major Lanyev
 1983 The Sign of Four as Bartholomew Sholto
 1992 Rebecca's Daughters as Sir Henry
 1994 Heavenly Creatures as Dr. Henry Hulme
 1995 An Awfully Big Adventure as Desmond Fairchild
 1996 The English Patient as Fenelon-Barnes
 1996 True Blue as Jack Garnet
 1997 Photographing Fairies as Gardner
 1999 Janice Beard as Tobo
 2000 Saving Grace as Quentin
 2000 Up at the Villa as Archibald Grey
 2000 Pandaemonium as Dr. Gillman
 2001 The Discovery of Heaven as Theo Kern
 2006 The History Boys as The Headmaster
 2012 Bert and Dickie as Clement Attlee
 2015 The Lady in the Van as Man In Confessional
 2018 The Guernsey Literary and Potato Peel Pie Society as Mr. Gilbert

References

External links

1945 births
Living people
Welsh male radio actors
Welsh male television actors
Royal Shakespeare Company members
Alumni of Rose Bruford College